Sólbjørg Jakobsen (born 8 August 1991) is a Faroese-born Danish jurist and politician serving as Member of the Folketing for Liberal Alliance since the 2022 election.

Career 
Jakobsen graduated with a Candidate of Law in 2016 from Aalborg University.

Although Jakobsen began her political career with Venstre, she switched to Liberal Alliance in 2019 and has been an active candidate since.

In the 2022 Danish general election, Jakobsen was one of 14 elected members of the party Liberal Alliance. She received 4,421 personal votes in the constituency North Jutland.

Personal life 
Jakobsen is engaged and has two children.

References 

Women members of the Folketing
1991 births
Living people
21st-century Danish politicians
Aalborg University alumni
Liberal Alliance (Denmark) politicians
21st-century Danish women politicians
People from Tórshavn
Members of the Folketing 2022–2026